List of largest optical telescopes in Ireland and the United Kingdom is a list of the largest optical telescopes in the British Isles, including in the United Kingdom and Ireland.

Some of the most famous telescopes would be Herschel's reflector, which he discovered Georgium Sidus, the Leviathan of Parsontown which at 1.8 meters (72  inches) was for decades the largest aperture telescope in the World, and in the 20th century many older telescopes are popular tourist attractions such as at Royal Observatory in Greenwich, London. There is also number of modest instruments at universities used for various astronomical projects or education.

The biggest optical telescope was the Isaac Newton Telescope at Herstmonceux, with a 98 inch mirror (~249 cm); it was there from 1965 to 1980; a lot of astronomy moved to off-site telescopes in space or distant mountains, with data transmitted electronically. The void left for public outreach is filled in part by planetariums and various museum pieces.

The list is not really representative of the largest telescopes operated by the United Kingdom or Ireland, which by the 20th century were building large telescopes overseas or in the southern hemisphere for better weather or other reasons.

Current list 

The following is a non-comprehensive list of optical telescopes currently located in the British Isles with an aperture of 24" or greater:

Historical

Isaac Newton Telescope at Herstmonceux, 98 inches (1965-1979)
Leviathan of Parsonstown, 1842- ~1890
3-foot telescope at Parsons
RGO telescopes at different points in its history
38-inch Hargreaves Reflector (1960)
Yapp 36-inch Reflector (1932)
30-inch Steavenson Reflector (1939)
28-inch Refractor (1893)
Thompson Telescope with a  26-inch refractor and 30-inch reflector on one mounting (1896)
Lassell 2-foot Reflector (1845)
Isaac Roberts 20-inch reflector (1885)
Western Equatorial (c.1824)
13-inch Astrographic Refractor (1890)
Merz 12.8-inch Visual Refractor (1859-1893) (this was replaced by the 28 inch Grubb in the onion dome)
Thomson 9-inch Photographic Refractor (c.1888)
Sheepshanks refractor 6.7-inch (1838) (aka  Sheepshanks Equatorial)
6-inch Franklin Adams  Camera (1898)
Shuckburgh telescope a 4.1-inch aperture Refractor (1791)
At the Observatory Science Center (at Herstmonceux)
Hargreaves 38 inch Congo Schmidt
Yapp 36 Inch reflector
Thompson 30 inch reflector
Thompson 26 inch reflector
Markree Observatory 13.3" Cauchoix  (the largest refractor of the early 1830s)
A.A. Commons reflectors (later reworked into Crossley and Harvard telescopes)
Lassel's reflector, this 24 inch metal mirror telescope was used to discover the moon's Triton and Hyperion.
Newton's reflector
40-foot telescope (England)
Armagh Observatory 15-inch Grubb reflecting telescope. Specula metal mirror mounted on an equatorial, with clockwork-drive.
Bedford Observatory Tully 5.9 inch refractor (8.5 feet focal length); Dollond mount with Sheepshanks clockwork drive.
Cambridge Observatory 36 inch (3 foot ~91.44 cm) aperture reflector

Observations 
A noted accomplishment of the biggest telescope at the time, Ross's "six foot" leviathan, was the observation of the spiral structure of M51, which was presented at Cambridge in the summer of 1845. Herschel was quite prolific discovering a planet and many moons of the Solar system also with his reflectors.

See also
Lists of telescopes
List of telescopes of Australia
David Dunlap Observatory (Largest telescope of the British Empire in the 1930s)

References

External links
The 98 inch (249 cm) mirror glass of original INT

Lists of telescopes
Astronomy in Ireland